Enoch Barton Garey (August 7, 1883 – September 24, 1957) was a Maryland native who served as a major in World War I and as a commander in the Maryland State Police force. Garey was also a military expert and author of the book The Plattsburg Manual: A Handbook for Federal Training Camps.

Early career
Garey was born on a small farm near Tuckahoe Neck, in Caroline County, Maryland. Young Garey attended St. John's College in Annapolis, Maryland (class of 1903), and then West Point Military Academy. After graduating in 1908, Garey served in the army until 1923. His service included World War I, in which he led a combat patrol that penetrated enemy lines and returned with four prisoners without casualties.  Major Garey collected valuable information while being exposed to machine-gun fire and grenade fire from a superior number of enemies.

President of St.John's College
In 1923 Garey became president of his alma mater, St. John's, narrowing the military scope of the college so students could concentrate on getting a bachelor's degree.  He abolished compulsory military training, replacing the cadet corps with a voluntary ROTC. In September 1924 Garey brought the nation's first Naval Reserve program to St. John's as a pilot program to test the scheme for the Navy. (The US Naval Academy in Annapolis would not begin issuing bachelor's degrees until 1933.) Program graduates were appointed as ensigns in the Naval Reserve.  This initial program's success was enough to convince the Navy to establish six full-scale NROTC programs at Northwestern, Harvard, Yale, UC Berkeley, the University of Washington and Georgia Institute of Technology in 1926.  Thus, the 1924-25 catalog was correct in saying, "This is the only college at which such a unit is maintained. In the future there will be many other colleges having such a course, but St. John's has the honor of being the first."

Maryland Police Force
In 1926, though, Garey left St. John's and the voluntary ROTC program folded.  By 1929 the Naval Reserve unit and Department of Naval Science had also disappeared due to lack of interest, despite the longevity of the six regular programs that had succeeded the St. John's College experiment (which all still exist in 2013, albeit with significant historical gaps at Harvard and Yale). After St. John's, Garey became involved in the Maryland Police Force. One of his most memorable experiences was on February 8, 1936. He and some other members of his police force attempted to deliver food to the people of Tangier Island during a terrible ice and snow storm. While attempting to deliver the food, fellow Sergeant William V. Hunter got stuck in the frozen ice of Chesapeake Bay and died of frostbite and exposure. After retiring from the State Police force, Garey settled down in his Towson home off of Joppa Road with his wife Alice, four sons, and two daughters.  He was head of the Veteran's Administration in Westwood (Los Angeles, CA) during World War II, and resided in Santa Monica.

He died in Los Angeles on September 24, 1957.

References

External links
 
 

1883 births
1957 deaths
United States Army personnel of World War I
United States Military Academy alumni
People from Caroline County, Maryland
Burials at Los Angeles National Cemetery